E11EVEN Miami is a multilevel nightclub located in downtown Miami. The night club was opened February 5, 2014.

History 

Construction of E11EVEN Miami was completed in 2013, and it was first opened to the public on February 5, 2014.

Ventures

Housing 
In 2021, the club ventured into residential housing.

Cryptocurrency 
On January 18, 2018, the North American Bitcoin Conference chose the Ultraclub to host the conference. 

On April 13, 2021, E11Even Miami became the first nightclub to accept Bitcoin and other cryptocurrencies.

Notable attendees 
The night club has been noted for hosting several high profile patrons.

In August 2016, Drake and Rihanna were spotted kissing at the club.

According to TMZ, in February 2020, Post Malone reportedly gave away $50,000 in singles to the crowd inside of E11Even Miami.

On September 25, 2021, G-Eazy was spotted in 11Even Miami after his public break up with singer Halsey.

References

Further reading 

 
 
 
 
 
 

Nightclubs in Miami
2014 establishments in Florida
Bars (establishments)